Tales of Nazir is a Ghanaian comic animation series that is based on the life story of Nazir and challenges he faces. The series was created by Ghanaian animator Louis Appiah and has been running since 2014.

Filmography

Film
 Tales of Nazir – The Movie Book of Eden

Animated seriesNazir and Okra (Nana Akradaa Wahala)Tales of Nazir – Nazir Mona BosomTales of Nazir – Shatta Gringo.Tales of Nazir – Nazir and Kofi Kinaata.Tales of Nazir – Polling Assistant.Tales of Nazir – Eye Galagcee.Tales of Nazir – Rice Cooker.Tales of Nazir – Dumsor.Tales of Nazir – Bribery Gone Wrong.Tales of Nazir – Movenpick.Tales of Nazir – Visa Palava.Tales of Nazir – Call To God.Tales of Nazir – Nam 1 Finally Speaks.Tales of Nazir – Nazir's New Girl Friend Akua Becca.Tales of Nazir – Nazir, Kofi Kinaata & Anas.Tales of Nazir – Captain Planet with Bra Charles.Tales of Nazir – Nazir in Lagos.Tales of Nazir – Nazir And Wanluv Press Conference Gone Wrong.Tales of Nazir – Nazir And Bedi Ragga Battle.Tales of Nazir – Number 13, Nazir with countryman Songo And Abatay.Tales of Nazir – Nazir With Countryman Songo.Tales of Nazir – Menzgold Commercial With Nazir And Joselyn Dumas.Tales of Nazir – Valentine Special With Akuaa Becca And Nazir.Tales of Nazir – Keep The Peace.Tales of Nazir – Nazir Meets Stonebwoy in London.Tales of Nazir – Nazir Is Grown Up.A Letter to the President.Nazir Meets Ebola.My Dear GrandpaYoung Nazir and John DumeloTales of Nazir – QuarantineTales of Nazir – Bossom Pyung meets Hajia4ReallTales of Nazir – Nazir in MoscowTales of Nazir – Elevy Whahala!''

References

Ghanaian comedy films